William Still Littlejohn (19 September 1859 – 7 October 1933) was a Scottish-born schoolteacher who spent most of his working life in New Zealand and Australia. He was headmaster of Nelson College from 1899 to 1903, and of Scotch College, Melbourne from 1904 to 1933. As a cricketer, he played two-first class games for Nelson in 1886.

Biography
Littlejohn was born in Turriff, Aberdeenshire, Scotland, the son of Wilson Littlejohn, a watchmaker and jeweller, and his wife Margaret, née Gordon. Educated at the board schools at Alford and Peterhead, and Aberdeen Grammar School, Littlejohn then entered the University of Aberdeen, graduating with a Master of Arts degree in 1879. He was registered as a teacher in 1879 and taught at Clydesdale College, Hamilton, then tutored privately.

Littlejohn's father and brother had emigrated to New Zealand, and in 1881 they obtained nominated passages for the rest of the family. William Littlejohn was mathematics and science master at Nelson College from 1882 to 1898, and headmaster for five years from 1899 to 1903. He married Jeannie Berry in Wellington on 25 December 1885. The couple had five children, including Charles Littlejohn.

During his time in Nelson, Littlejohn played two first-class matches as a batsman for the Nelson cricket team in 1886. In his three innings he scored only eight runs, including two ducks. He also served as president of the Nelson Rugby Union.

Littlejohn successfully applied for the position of headmaster at Scotch College, Melbourne, a position he held until his death at the school on 7 October 1933. Littlejohn insisted upon improvements at the school before commencing and continued building the school. In 1914 the school moved from East Melbourne to Hawthorn, and by 1923 there were 1200 students.

References

1859 births
1933 deaths
People from Turriff
Scottish emigrants to New Zealand
Nelson College faculty
New Zealand cricketers
Nelson cricketers
New Zealand sports executives and administrators
Australian headmasters
Chairmen of the Headmasters' Conference of the Independent Schools of Australia
Heads of schools in New Zealand
20th-century Australian educators
People educated at Aberdeen Grammar School
Alumni of the University of Aberdeen
New Zealand emigrants to Australia
Scotch College, Melbourne